Truncatellina costulata is a species of very small air-breathing land snail, a terrestrial pulmonate gastropod mollusk in the family Truncatellinidae.

Distribution 
This species occurs in:
 Czech Republic - in Bohemia and in Moravia.
 Slovakia
 Ukraine

References

Truncatellinidae
Gastropods described in 1823